Library Review is an academic journal which was established in 1927. This journal focuses on social sciences, specific to library and information sciences. The journal is published nine times a year by Emerald Group Publishing. The editor-in-chief is Judith Broady-Preston (Aberystwyth University).

In January 2018, Library Review was renamed Global Knowledge, Memory and Communication (GKMC).

References

External links 
 

Library science journals
Information technology management
Publications established in 1927
English-language journals
Emerald Group Publishing academic journals
9 times per year journals